Skua Creek is a narrow channel between Skua Island and Winter Island in the Argentine Islands, Wilhelm Archipelago. Charted and named Skua Inlet in 1935 by the British Graham Land Expedition (BGLE) under Rymill, but in recent years the name Skua Creek has overtaken the earlier name in usage.

Straits of the Wilhelm Archipelago